Harpa gracilis, common name the Polynesian harp, is a species of sea snail, a marine gastropod mollusk in the family Harpidae, the harp snails.

Description
The size of the shell varies between 20 mm and 42 mm.

Distribution
This marine species occurs in Polynesia and off Clipperton Island.

References

External links
 

Harpidae
Gastropods described in 1829